Tarvin is a civil parish in Cheshire West and Chester, England. It contains 27 buildings that are recorded in the National Heritage List for England as designated listed buildings. Of these, one is listed at Grade I, the highest grade, two are listed at Grade II*, the middle grade, and the others are at Grade II. The parish contains the village of Tarvin, and is otherwise rural. The listed buildings include the village church and structures in the churchyard, houses, cottages, a shop, a war memorial, and a public house. Outside the village they are houses and farmhouses.

Key

Buildings

See also
 Listed buildings in Ashton Hayes
 Listed buildings in Barrow, Cheshire
 Listed buildings in Bruen Stapleford
 Listed buildings in Burton
 Listed buildings in Christleton
 Listed buildings in Cotton Edmunds
 Listed buildings in Duddon

 Listed buildings in Horton cum Peel
 Listed buildings in Huxley
 Listed buildings in Kelsall
 Listed buildings in Willington

References
Citations

Sources

 

Listed buildings in Cheshire West and Chester
Lists of listed buildings in Cheshire